African Handball Champions League is an annual international club handball competition run by the African Handball Confederation. The top club sides from Africa's handball leagues are invited to participate in the tournament, which serves as a qualifying tournament for the IHF Super Globe.

Since 2013, Algeria has decided not to participate in any continental competition due to the participation of clubs from Western Sahara under the flag of Morocco as Algeria recognizes Western Sahara as a state.

Summary 

 A round-robin tournament determined the final standings.

Winners by club

Rq:
GS Pétroliers (ex. MC Alger & MP Alger)
OC Alger (ex. DNC Alger & IRB Alger)

Winners by country

IHF Super Globe record

See also
 African Handball Cup Winners' Cup
 African Handball Super Cup
 African Men's Handball Championship

References

External links
 African Handball Champions League  - goalzz.com
 Men's & Women's Champions League history - cahbonline

 
African Handball Confederation competitions
African handball club competitions
Multi-national professional sports leagues